Andreea Luiza Ogrăzeanu (born 24 March 1990, Alexandria) is a Romanian sprinter. At the 2012 Summer Olympics, she competed in the Women's 100 metres and the women's 200 metres.

She studied physical education at the University of Craiova.

Competition record

References
 

1990 births
Romanian female sprinters
Living people
Olympic athletes of Romania
Athletes (track and field) at the 2012 Summer Olympics
Universiade medalists in athletics (track and field)
Universiade bronze medalists for Romania

People from Alexandria, Romania
Competitors at the 2011 Summer Universiade
Competitors at the 2015 Summer Universiade
Medalists at the 2013 Summer Universiade
Olympic female sprinters